Centerview may refer to:

Places
Centerview, Kansas, an unincorporated community in Edwards County
Centerview (Lynchburg, Virginia),  a historic home
Centerview, Missouri, a city in Johnson County

Other
Centerview Partners, an independent investment banking and private equity investment firm